Walter Gordon "Don" Spencer (2 August 1912 – 20 July 1971) was an English cricketer.  Spencer was a right-handed batsman who bowled slow left-arm orthodox.  He was born at Chingford, Essex.

Spencer made his first-class debut for Essex against Somerset in the 1938 County Championship.  He made a further first-class appearance that season against Middlesex.  He scored a total of 27 runs in these two matches at an average of 9.00, with a high score of 10.  Following World War II, Spencer returned to Essex to play a single first-class match in 1948 against Middlesex.  In this match, he scored 25 runs in Essex's first-innings before being dismissed by Denis Compton.  He took his only first-class wicket in Middlesex's second-innings when he dismissed Sydney Brown.

He died on 20 July 1971 at Chelmsford, Essex.

References

External links
Don Spencer at ESPNcricinfo
Don Spencer at CricketArchive

1912 births
1971 deaths
People from Chingford
English cricketers
Essex cricketers